Michael Hubner (born 12 August 1969) is a retired German footballer.

References

External links

 

1969 births
Living people
German footballers
VfL Bochum players
VfL Bochum II players
Rot-Weiss Essen players
FC 08 Homburg players
Rot Weiss Ahlen players
Bundesliga players
2. Bundesliga players
Germany under-21 international footballers
Association football midfielders
SpVgg Erkenschwick players